Windows 10 Creators Update (also known as version 1703 and codenamed "Redstone 2") is the third major update to Windows 10 and the second in a series of updates under the Redstone codenames. It carries the build number 10.0.15063.

PC version history
The first preview was released to Insiders on August 11, 2016. The final release was made available to Windows Insiders on March 20, 2017, followed by a public release on April 5 via Update Assistant, and began to roll out on April 11.

The update reached end of service after the release of build 15063.2108 on October 8, 2019. Support of the update on Surface Hub devices was available until March 9, 2021.

Mobile version history

See also
Windows 10 version history
Windows 10 Mobile version history

References

Windows 10
History of Microsoft
Software version histories